Platerodrilus paradoxus is a species of trilobite beetle. It is only known from Sarawak (Malaysian Borneo).

References

External links
 EOL page
 Photos (as Duliticola paradoxa)

Lycidae
Beetles of Asia
Insects of Malaysia
Endemic fauna of Borneo
Beetles described in 1925